Israeli military ensembles are artistic ensembles and military bands maintained by the Israel Defense Forces, which are the combined military forces of the State of Israel. There are two types of musical ensembles in the IDF: Military bands and Entertainment troupes. Military bands provide martial music during official events of state and military ceremonies. Entertainment troupes conduct public in theatrical settings, most notably in musicals. They usually consist of musicians and singers who have passed auditions prior to their enlistment for compulsory service.

History
Prior to the establishment of the State of Israel in 1948, military ensembles have been active and prominent in the region for many decades. The British Army regularly switched out its military bands attached to its regiments in the British Mandate of Palestine (now Israel). Local bands such as the Alexandroni Brigade Band were also maintained. Some of the last British regimental bands to arrive in the region were those of the Royal Irish Fusiliers, Argyll and Sutherland Highlanders, and the King's Own Scottish Borderers. As it refers to military bands in the current borders of Israel, the well-known ones were composed from small groups of soldiers who were organized in the country's first 20 years in existence, formed from soldiers who served in battalions in remote parts of the country. The first Israeli military band was the IDF Orchestra, which was the result of the amalgamation of 4 bands that operated prior to the country's creation. Jewish musicians, particularly those from the Soviet Union and Eastern Europe like Izhak Muse and Michael Yaaran came in the years that followed and joined the band.

The Golden Age of Israeli military bands was reached in the late 1960s and the mid-70s. During this period, many famous and actors and musicians received their musical education from military bands rather than a music school, which came as a general rule from the musical traditions of the British Armed Forces. In 1978, the Chief of the General Staff, General Rafael Eitan, issued an order to disband military ensembles in favor of the IDF Orchestra as the sole musical unit at ceremonies. In 1985, military ensembles were recreated for a short time, however, they are no longer as popular as they were previously. Another particularity that came from this period was the fostering of small musical troupes that served unconventionally as theatrical music bands that became the backbone of bands in the IDF. Today, bands in the IDF have similarities to their American and British counterparts, and in the case of the IDF Orchestra, Russian element as well, due to its trumpeters being stationed at the front of the band.

Defence Forces Orchestra

The Israel Defense Forces Orchestra (Tizmoret Tzahal) is the main musical ensemble of the Israel Defense Forces (IDF). It is the flagship ensemble of the IDF and responsible for live musical accompaniment at all national events taking place in the capitals of Tel Aviv and Jerusalem. It often performs at official military ceremonies and honor guards in the IDF. It is located in at Aviv Camp in the neighborhood of Ramat Aviv. It was established in 1948 out of four orchestras: The Alexandria Division Band, The Jewish Brigade Band, The Artillery Corps Band and The Givati Brigade Band. Its first conductor was Izhak Muse, a Soviet immigrant who played wind instruments.  Since the 2000s, the orchestra has performs annually at the Rishon LeZion Festival on Sukkot has become a tradition.

IDF Choir
The IDF Military Rabbinate Choir was established in 1967 as part of the IDF Orchestra to strengthen the connection of soldiers to religious life and Jewish culture. Since its establishment, the choir's repertoire has included Hasidic songs, traditional songs as well as selections of folk songs. The original conductor, Menashe Lev-Ran, was responsible for adaptation of these various songs into a military format. After the Six-Day War, the choir put together its first program and, after the Yom Kippur War, recorded four albums with four programs. In 1977, a choral album was released that included four new songs. Because the choir is the only military band without singers, it performs in various military ceremonies such as the swearing-in, track-ending ceremonies and the like, especially in combat units, where there is a high percentage of soldiers and religious commanders and their families. The most prominent of its former members are Zion Golan, Moshe Lion, and Dudu Fisher. Outside the IDF Orchestra, it is also part of the Military Rabbinate.

Regional and musical ensembles past and present

The following ensembles are part of the IDF:

Israeli Air Force Band
Israeli Navy Band
The Nahal Band
Carmeli Brigade Band
Givati Brigade Band
Golani Brigade Band
Artillery Corps Band
Gadna Band
Education and Youth Corps Band
GOC Army Headquarters Band
Central Command Band
Northern Command Band
Southern Command Band
Air Force Entertainment Team
Israeli Combat Engineering Corps Band
Paratroopers Brigade Band
Golan Heights Team
Armored Corps Band
Kaleid Kaleidim Band
Tel Litvinsky Band

All bands are found in the Education and Youth Corps of the IDF's Manpower Directorate. While this applies to most military bands, the IDF Orchestra belongs to the directorate's Regime and Discipline Branch that is responsible for Israel's state and military events. The Outstanding Musicians Program is the most common avenue that soldiers take to develop their musical skills during their military service.

Pivotal music directors

Shalom Ronli-Riklis, expanded the then new IDF Band to become a prominent musical ensemble in Israel. Under his leadership, it became the only army band in the world to have two orchestras: a symphonic orchestra, founded and a wind ensemble. 
Emanuel Amiran-Pougatchov, an army director who later served as the first appointed Inspector of Music (Minister for Music Education)
Erich Tych, the founder of the Israeli Air Force Band who led the unit for 35 years until his death in 1983.
Dov Seltzer, one of the founders as well as the first official composer for the Lehakat Hanachal. The songs he wrote for the band are today considered to be cornerstones of Israeli folk and popular music and are part of the standard repertoire for radio and TV in Israel and around the world.
Moshe Wilensky, he was a composer for multiple musical troupes of the IDF.
Yair Rosenblum, he conducted and composed many songs for ensembles in the Israeli Army and the Israeli Navy, and is known best for songs such as Shir LaShalom. He was musical director of the rabbinical choir in the 1960s and 1970s and has also directed many Israeli music festivals.

In popular culture
The Band was a 1978 comedic musical, depicting an army singing group in 1968.

See also
 Royal Corps of Army Music
 United States military bands
 Russian military bands
 Jordanian Armed Forces Band
 Israel Police Orchestra
 Military band#Israel

External links
 The official website of the Israel Defense Forces Orchestra

References

Israeli music